The Netherlands Women's Volleyball Eredevisie is the major volleyball competition, disputed in the Netherlands since 1947. It is organized by the Dutch Volleyball Federation (Nederlandse Volleybalbond, Nevobo)
.

Competition formula
The 2021/22 League A championship consisted of a preliminary stage and a playoff. At the preliminary stage, the participating teams plays in a regular home and away tournament. The top 8 advanced to the playoffs. 
13 teams played in League A in 2021/22: Talenttim-Papendal (Arnhem), Slieedrecht Sport (Sliedrecht), Apollo 8 (Borne), Regio-Zwolle (Zwolle), Sneek, Boleans (Utrecht), Laudamme (Capelle aan den IJssel), Pelpus (Meyel), Draisma-Dynamo (Apeldoorn), ARBO (Rotterdam), Airsped-Twente (Almelo), Voltena (Werkendam), Lammerink-Set-Ap'65 (Otmarsum). The championship title was won by Sliedrecht Sport for the Eight times in their history, beating up Apollo 8 in a final series 2-0 (3:0, 3:1). 3rd place went to "Regio Zwolle".

List of Champions

References

External links
The Netherlands Volleyball Federation
  Dutch Eredivisie. women.volleybox.net 

the Netherlands
Volleyball in the Netherlands
Dutch Eredevisie
Professional sports leagues in the Netherlands